Maktoum bin Rashid Al Maktoum Stadium is a multi-use stadium in Dubai, United Arab Emirates. It was named after Sheikh Maktoum bin Rashid Al Maktoum. It is currently used mostly for football matches and serves as the home stadium of former home Al Shabab Al Arabi Club of the UAE Pro League, but after Al Shabab merged with Al Ahli and Dubai to form Shabab Al-Ahli Club, it became a secondary stadium to Shabab Al Ahli. The stadium holds 12,000 spectators.

References

Football venues in the United Arab Emirates
Sports venues in Dubai